Ibrahima Wade (born 6 September 1968) is a French sprinter who specializes in the 400 metres. He switched nationality from his birth country Senegal in 2000.

His personal best time is 45.05 seconds, achieved in August 1998 in Dakar. With 45.76 seconds from July 2004, he held the Masters M35 World record.   The record has been improved upon twice since, by Alvin Harrison (DOM) with a 45.68 in 2009 and by Chris Brown (BAH),with a 44.59  in 2014. but neither of those marks have yet been ratified by World Masters Athletics, so Wade's mark still stands as the official record.

He reached the semi finals of the World Championships in 1997 and 1999.

Achievements

References

External links

1968 births
Living people
French male sprinters
Senegalese male sprinters
French sportspeople of Senegalese descent
Athletes (track and field) at the 2000 Summer Olympics
Athletes (track and field) at the 2004 Summer Olympics
Olympic athletes of Senegal
Olympic athletes of France
World record holders in masters athletics
European Athletics Championships medalists